Francis Peter Ryan (14 November 1888 – 5 January 1954) was an English first-class cricketer who played for Glamorgan.

Ryan, born in Tundla, North-Western Provinces, British India, was a left arm finger spinner and took 913 wickets for Glamorgan in a career which spanned three decades. He had debuted in 1919 for Hampshire and played two seasons for the county. In 1921 he joined the Lancashire Leagues and impressed the Glamorgan recruiters who signed him for the following summer.

In a game against Derbyshire during the 1925 season he took his career best figures of 8 for 41 to finish the year with 133 wickets. It was one of five years that he managed to take 100 wickets and the total set a Glamorgan record for most wickets in a county season until it was surpassed four years later by Jack Mercer.

Ryan's career was overshadowed at times by his controversial off-field persona, particularly his heavy drinking.

References

External links

1888 births
1954 deaths
English cricketers
Glamorgan cricketers
Hampshire cricketers
Wales cricketers
North v South cricketers
H. D. G. Leveson Gower's XI cricketers
British people in colonial India